The national flag of Luxembourg consists of three horizontal stripes, red, white and light blue, and can be in 1:2 or 3:5 ratio. It was first used between 1845 and 1848 and officially adopted in 1993. It is informally called in the country, «rout, wäiß, blo» ("red, white, [light] blue").

Luxembourg had no flag until 1830, when patriots were urged to display the national colours. The flag was defined as a horizontal tricolour of red, white, and blue in 1848, but it was not officially adopted until 1993. The tricolour flag is almost identical to Flag of the Netherlands, except that it is longer and its light blue stripe and red stripe are a lighter shade.  The red, white, and light blue colours were derived from the coat of arms of the House of Luxembourg.

History
The colours of the flag of Luxembourg were first adopted around 1830 during the Belgian Revolution. They were probably derived from the coat of arms of the County and later Duchy of Luxembourg,  which in turn was derived from the combination of the lion of the dukes of Limbourg and the supposed striped banner of the early counts of Luxembourg. The three-coloured horizontal design was fixed on 12 June 1845.

It took until 1993 before a law was passed regulating the flag of Luxembourg.  The same law also prescribed ensign and roundel for aircraft and ships registered in Luxembourg.

One important clarification brought by this law was that the color blue was defined as being a very bright blue, in contrast to the flag of the Netherlands (exactly the same design, but the Dutch flag uses dark blue and a less oblong shape).

The heraldic blazon for the flag is per fess Gules and Azure, a fess Argent.

Ensign

The red lion is the official ensign for ships registered in Luxembourg. It is used for river and sea shipping, as well as for aviation. This flag is based on the coat of arms of Luxembourg (a banner of arms) and is used as the ensign to avoid the possibility of Luxembourg's ensign being confused for that of the Netherlands.  Ten white and blue stripes serve as the field for a red lion with a yellow tongue, claws and crown, and a doubled tail (à la queue fourchée). The proper ratio for this ensign is 5:7.

The Réglement Grand-Ducal of 27 July 1993 defined the ensign's colours as follows:

Roundel 

The roundel of Luxembourg is seen on the AWACS aircraft used by NATO and on the Airbus A400M operated by the Luxembourg Armed Forces.

Flag change debate

The resemblance of the Luxembourgish flag with the Dutch flag has given rise to a national debate to change it.

On 5 October 2006, MP Michel Wolter introduced a legislative proposition to replace the current red-white-blue national flag with the red lion ensign. He argued that the current flag was commonly confused with that of the Netherlands and that the red lion on the other hand was more popular, more aesthetic and of greater historic value. Wolter also claimed he had personally discussed the matter with some three hundred people, most of whom expressed their support for his initiative. On the other hand, many national politicians (including leading members of Wolter's own CSV) and VIPs have expressed astonishment in the local media concerning both the timing and necessity for such a change. Wolter was supported in his initiative by the centre-right ADR.

On 24 October 2006, a local initiative called Initiativ Roude Léiw ("Red Lion Initiative") held a press conference explaining their intention to support Wolter's project on a non-partisan basis. Their first actions would include distribution of red lion bumper stickers, a petition and a poll. During sporting events like the Tour de France supporters for Luxembourg participants now overwhelmingly use the Ensign instead of the Flag.

In end of July 2015, a Luxembourger Marc Dax submitted a formal petition to the Chamber of Deputies to replace the current national flag with the Roude Léiw. It received a little less than 500 signatures.

For historical reasons, the adjacent Belgian province of Luxembourg uses a flag that also features a lion superimposed on horizontal stripes. Elsewhere, similar designs can also be found, for instance in the Belgian city of Bruges and the German state of Hesse.

Two civil official flags 
On 6 July 2007, the Government stated that the Roude Léiw would be accepted as a Civil flag only within the territory of the Grand-Duchy along with the National flag keeping the same proportions, i.e. 1:2 or 3:5 as the National flag to avoid confusion with the Civil ensign.

See also
List of flags of Luxembourg

Notes

External links 

  
 Loi du 23 juin 1972 sur les emblèmes nationaux (1972 law, unamended) Memorial, A, number 51, of 16 August 1972
 Loi du 27 juillet 1993 modifiant et complétant la loi du 23 juin 1972 sur les emblèmes nationaux (1993 amendments, and a consolidated version of the law) Memorial, A, number 73, of 16 September 1993
 About... symbols of the state and the nation Government brochure on the coats of arms, National Day, flag and the national anthem

National symbols of Luxembourg
Luxembourg
1845 establishments in Luxembourg
Luxembourg